Shahid Soleimani Metro Station is the western terminus of Tehran Metro Line 5. It is located east of Hashtgerd towards the Mehestan New Town development. The next station is Golshahr Metro Station.

References

Tehran Metro stations